Harvey Max Chochinov  is a Canadian academic and psychiatrist from Winnipeg who specializes in palliative care. As of 2016, he was a Distinguished Professor of Psychiatry at the University of Manitoba. He was offered an appointment to the Senate of Canada in October 2016 by Prime Minister Justin Trudeau, but ultimately declined to take his seat for "personal, family, and professional reasons" in February 2017.

Career 
Chochinov is a leading expert in palliative care, with a focus on the dignity of patients, proper communication, and existential suffering. He developed dignity therapy, which is currently used by doctors worldwide as its benefits for patients at the end of life, relatives and health professionals have been proved. Dignity therapy involves creating a narrative document with the dying patient that gives them the chance to reflect on their life experiences.

He was a co-founder of the Canadian Virtual Hospice, which serves as a resource centre for anyone involved with palliative care. He is a distinguished professor of psychiatry at the University of Manitoba and the director of the Manitoba Palliative Care Research Unit at CancerCare.

In 2012, Chochinov won the Canadian Medical Association's Frederic Newton Gisborne Starr Award, for his contributions to palliative care.

In 2015, Chochinov chaired the External Panel on Options for a Legislative Response to Carter v. Canada which informed eventual legislation on medically-assisted death. Chochinov was himself an opponent of medically-assisted death.

In November 2015, Chochinov was invested as an Officer of the Order of Canada for his work on improving end-of-life care for Canadians.

In April 2016, Chochinov was named the University of Manitoba's first research chair in palliative care medicine.

Senate appointment
On October 27, 2016, Chochinov was announced one of the successful applicants to fill three Manitoba vacancies in the Senate of Canada. A statement from the Office of Prime Minister Justin Trudeau noted Trudeau intended to recommend the appointment of Chochinov and other selectees to Governor General David Johnston and that they would sit as independents. As of December 6, 2016, all new senators from that intake round other than Chochinov had been formally summoned to the Senate. On February 2, 2017, the Privy Council Office made public that Dr. Chochinov had advised the Prime Minister that he would not accept the appointment to the Senate, citing "personal, family and professional reasons."

References

Living people
Canadian psychiatrists
Academic staff of the University of Manitoba
Officers of the Order of Canada
Members of the Order of Manitoba
Year of birth missing (living people)